Kumahara ("bear meadow"; also ) is a Japanese surname. The same characters could also be read "Kumabara" or "Kumanohara". People with this surname include:

Caio Japa, nickname of Caio Takeo Kumahara (born 1983), Brazilian futsal player
Caroline Kumahara (born 1995), Brazilian table tennis player

See also
, Japanese baseball pitcher

References

Japanese-language surnames